Kosi Kalan is a city & municipality of Mathura district in the Indian state of Uttar Pradesh. It is about 45km from Mathura city and 100km from New Delhi located in 27°47′N 77°26′E NH02 (Now NH 19 after renumbering) Delhi-Agra highway well connected with Mathura, Agra and Delhi with train and road. Khurd and Kalan Persian language word which means small and big respectively when two villages have same name then it is distinguished as Kalan means big and Khurd means small.

1. Lala Gayalal Agrawal (1939 - 1944) 2. Lalaram Agarwal (1944 - 1953) 3. Chetram Agarwal (1953 - 1956) 4. Pannalal Agarwal ( 3 Months in 1956) 5. Basant Lal Khandelwal (1956 - 1959) 6. Phool Chand Jain (1959 - 1964) 7. Hariram Bansal (1960 - 1963) 8. Babulal Agrawal (1964 - 1971) 9. Harmukh Ray Khandelwal (1971 - 1972)  10. Jagadish Prasad Agrawal (1973 - 1976) 11. Jagadish Prasad Agrawal (1976 - 1980) 12. Jagadish Prasad Agarwal (1988 - 1994) 13. Indira Sharma (1995 - 2000) 14. Roshanlal Agrawal (2001 - 2005) 15. Vandana Agarwal (2006 - 2012) 16. Bhagwat Prasad Ruhela (2012 - 2017) 17. Narendra Kumar (2017 – Current)

Demographics 
 India census, Kosi Kalan had a population of 60,074. Males constitute 53.15% of the population and females 46.85%. Kosi Kalan has an average literacy rate of 69.8%, lower than the national average of 74.04%: male literacy is 78.41%, and female literacy is 60.08%. In Kosi Kalan, 18% of the population is under 6 years of age.

References 

Cities and towns in Mathura district